The ATEC 212 Solo is a Czech ultralight aircraft, designed and produced by ATEC v.o.s. of Libice nad Cidlinou. The aircraft is supplied as a complete ready-to-fly-aircraft.

Design and development
The aircraft was designed to comply with the Fédération Aéronautique Internationale microlight rules. It features a cantilever low-wing, a single-seat, enclosed cockpit with a bubble canopy, fixed conventional landing gear and a single engine in tractor configuration.

The 212 Solo is made from carbon fibre and was derived from the ATEC 321 Faeta and ATEC 122 Zephyr 2000 designs. Its  span wing employs an SM701 airfoil and slotted flaps. Standard engines available are the  Rotax 582 two-stroke and the  Rotax 912UL four-stroke powerplant.

Specifications (212 Solo)

References

External links

2000s Czech ultralight aircraft
Single-engined tractor aircraft
ATEC aircraft